Ponerorchis simplex (synonym Amitostigma simplex) is a species of plant in the family Orchidaceae. It is endemic to China, found only in Sichuan and Yunnan. Its flowers are yellow, sometimes with brown spots.

Taxonomy
The species was first described in 1940 by Tsin Tang and Fa Tsuan Wang, as Amitostigma simplex. A molecular phylogenetic study in 2014 found that species of Amitostigma, Neottianthe and Ponerorchis were mixed together in a single clade, making none of the three genera monophyletic as then circumscribed. Amitostigma and Neottianthe were subsumed into Ponerorchis, with this species becoming Ponerorchis simplex.

References 

Endemic orchids of China
simplex
Endangered plants
Flora of Sichuan
Orchids of Yunnan
Plants described in 1940
Taxonomy articles created by Polbot
Taxobox binomials not recognized by IUCN